Tioga is a mixed-use development located about three miles west of Gainesville in unincorporated Alachua County, Florida, United States.

Tioga can be found along Florida State Road 26 east of the overlap with County Road 241.

History

Town of Tioga and Tioga Town Center

Demographics
In 2013, the Tioga area had an average household income of $84,487 and an average age of 37.45 years. By comparison, Alachua County as a whole had an average household income of $38,075 and an average age of 29.00 years.

References

External links 

Towns in Alachua County, Florida